Lake Luzerne is a lake in the town of Lake Luzerne, New York. Fish species present in the lake are northern pike, smallmouth bass, largemouth bass, rainbow trout, brown trout, rock bass, bluegill, yellow perch, pumpkinseed sunfish, brown bullhead, and chain pickerel. There is a boat launch on the west shore off County Route 9.

The lake contains multiple beaches available to the public including Wayside Beach. Ice fishing tournaments occur in the wintertime and vehicles can be driven on the ice.

A small bridge is located just near the beach where people will jump off into the water. This is dangerous because the water is not very deep in this location.

Ivy Island is the sole island in the lake. Access to the island is prohibited without permission from the town of Lake Luzerne. A trespassing fine of $250 has been imposed. According to local lore, the island is so named because of the presence of poison ivy.

References

Lakes of New York (state)
Lakes of Warren County, New York